Shuang Qiao Station is a station on the  of the Beijing Subway, and is located in the Sanjianfang area in Chaoyang District.

Station layout 
The station has 2 elevated side platforms.

Exits 
There are 2 exits, lettered A and B. Both are accessible.

External links

Beijing Subway stations in Chaoyang District
Railway stations in China opened in 2003